The Four Winds Casinos are a set of casinos located in the states of Indiana and Michigan in the United States. The casinos are owned by the Pokagon Band of Potawatomi Indians. The primary property is located in New Buffalo Township, Michigan, with satellite locations in Hartford, Michigan; Dowagiac, Michigan; and South Bend, Indiana.

History 
In 2007, as a federally recognized tribe, the Pokagon Band were able to develop and Four Winds New Buffalo on the Pokagon Reservation, in New Buffalo Township in accordance with the Indian Gaming Regulatory Act and a compact with Michigan. A second, satellite casino, Four Winds Hartford, opened on August 30, 2011, and a third, Four Winds Dowagiac, opened April 30, 2013.

The band was limited to three casinos by its 2008 compact with the state of Michigan. It has since constructed a casino on lands that it claimed qualified for gaming pursuant to specific provisions of the Indian Gaming Regulatory Act, in South Bend, Indiana. The band announced plans in 2012 to build this 164-acre "tribal village", which includes housing, healthcare, and government facilities, and a casino and hotel. Four Winds South Bend opened January 16, 2018. In January 2021, Pokagon Band of Potawatomi Indians launched Four Winds Online Casino, available to Michigan residents and guests. The casino is the online partner of theri brick-and-mortar casinos. In 2022, the South Bend location expanded to 98,000 square feet and features 1900 slot machines on its gaming floor, the most in Indiana. Four Winds South Bend's hotel opened March 1, 2023.

Properties 

Four Winds Casinos includes these properties:

Marketing 

The casinos utilize a loyalty program, known as the W♣ Players Club or simply the W Club.

On September 5, 2013, a ten-year naming agreement between the casinos and what became known as the Four Winds Field at Coveleski Stadium was announced.

See also 

 Gambling in Indiana
 List of casinos in Michigan

References

External links 
 

Casinos in Michigan
Native American casinos
Native American history of Michigan
Pokagon Band of Potawatomi Indians